Micro Genius is a brand name used for Famicom clone consoles marketed in several countries around the world, particularly in areas where Nintendo consoles were not readily available, including the Middle East, Southeast Asia, South America, Eastern Europe, South Africa and East Asian countries excluding Japan and South Korea. The name was initially and most famously used by TXC Corporation for its range of Taiwanese-made Famicom clones, software and accessories, but later passed to other companies and remains in use today on rebranded Chinese Famicom clones and LCD games.

In some countries - such as Malaysia - during the early 1990s, Micro Genius Famicom clones were the most popular game consoles, mirroring the popularity enjoyed several years earlier by Nintendo's official Famicom and NES in Japan and North America. In Russia certain models of Micro Genius were sold under the Dendy brand, and in Poland one version, the IQ-502, was released as a Pegasus console - both of which were also the most popular consoles in their respective countries - while in Colombia and certain other Latin American countries they were sold as Nichi-Man. Micro Genius consoles were also sighted being played by children in a North Korean children's camp in 2008, a country which few other video games have reached. However, they rarely reached markets where Nintendo was more recognisable, as they often infringed on Nintendo's patents in those regions.

Consoles and accessories

There are several models of the Micro Genius, but the Micro Genius IQ-501 was particularly popular until the official introduction of competitors like Sega and Nintendo in the regions where it was sold. The games came in form of 60-pin cartridges, identical to those of the Japanese Famicom, which were inserted from the top into a cartridge port. A standard Micro Genius console package came with two wired controllers and sometimes a light gun. Some models also used an RF antenna to transmit signals wirelessly to a receiver inserted in the TV. Later incarnations came with IR wireless controllers.

Micro Genius consoles include:
 IQ-201 - an early model resembling the Famicom, with hard-wired controllers
 IQ-301 - similar to the IQ-201, with the addition of turbo switches
 IQ-501 - introduces detachable controllers, sold as Dendy Classic in Russia
 IQ-502 - sold as Dendy Classic II in Russia and Pegasus IQ-502 in Poland
 IQ-701 - resembles the international Nintendo Entertainment System
 IQ-901 - an early handheld TV game
 IQ-1000 - built-in infra-red receiver, comes with one wireless controller and one wired
 IQ-2000 - similar to the IQ-1000 but comes with two wireless controllers

Accessories for other consoles were also sold under the Micro Genius brand, including lightguns and controllers for the original NES, and wireless controllers for the Mega Drive and SNES.

Games
Most versions of Micro Genius are compatible with Famicom cartridges but require a 72-pin to 60-pin adapter to play NES games, although certain models were produced in both 60-pin Famicom and 72-pin NES versions. It was often sold with cartridges containing multiple games. The 60-pin Famicom versions also generally supported expansion audio chips such as Konami's VRC6 and VRC7 making them a more affordable alternative for those in Europe wanting to play Famicom games with expansion audio without making modifications to the console as long as they don't mind 50 Hz slowdown.

A series of original Micro Genius games, such as Chinese Chess and Thunder Warrior, was produced in both Famicom and NES format, but unlicensed copies of Japanese games remained more popular in the countries where the console was sold.

List of games
On the list, all Idea-Tek games were later re-released by the same TXC/Micro Genius.

See also
 Nintendo
 Nintendo Entertainment System hardware clone

References

External links
 Famicom Clones

Unlicensed Nintendo Entertainment System hardware clones
Video game companies of Taiwan
Companies based in Taipei
Taiwanese brands